The 63rd Pennsylvania House of Representatives District is in Western Pennsylvania and has been represented by Donna Oberlander since 2009.

District Profile 
The 63rd District encompasses parts of Armstrong County and all of Clarion County and includes the following areas:

Armstrong County

Atwood
 Bradys Bend Township
Boggs Township
Cowanshannock Township
 Dayton
 Elderton
 Hovey Township
Kittanning
Kittanning
 Madison Township
 Mahoning Township
 Parker
 Perry Township
Pine Township
 Plumcreek Township
Rayburn Township
 Redbank Township
Rural Valley
 South Bethlehem
 Sugarcreek Township
Valley Township
 Washington Township
 Wayne Township
West Franklin Township
Worthington

Clarion County

Representatives

Recent election results

References

External links 

 District map from the United States Census Bureau
 Pennsylvania House Legislative District Maps from the Pennsylvania Redistricting Commission.
 Population Data for District 63 from the Pennsylvania Redistricting Commission.

Government of Armstrong County, Pennsylvania
Government of Clarion County, Pennsylvania
Government of Forest County, Pennsylvania
63